Melissa Panarello (born 3 December 1985, in Catania, Italy), alias Melissa P., is an Italian writer.

Biography
Panarello grew up in the small Sicilian town of Aci Castello, near Catania in Italy. In 2003, she became famous for authoring the erotic novel, 100 colpi di spazzola prima di andare a dormire (translated into English by Lawrence Venuti as One Hundred Strokes of the Brush Before Bed, 2004).  The novel, written in diary form, focuses on the narrator's extreme sexual life during her teenage years and is loosely based on the author's own experiences.

She gave birth to her first child in October 2019. In December 2022, she got married and is expecting her second child.

Books

References

External links
 
 The Punk Pornographer – Melissa Panarello in interview

1985 births
Living people
Italian erotica writers
writers from Catania